The Penzhina (Koryak: Мыгыкивэем) is a river in Kamchatka Krai, Russia.

The name "Penzhina" originated the Chukchi word "Pennyn", meaning "place of attack". In Koryak it is known as "Wegykiveem" (Мыгыкивэем), meaning "stormy river".

Course 
The source of the Penzhina is in the Kolyma Mountains, and it flows eastwards across the Ichigem Range. After bending southwards it enters a wide floodplain filled with lakes, finally flowing into the Penzhina Bay of the Sea of Okhotsk. 

The villages of Kamenskoye, Oklan, Slautnoye and Ayanka are located by the river, as well as the seaport of Manily. 

Its main tributaries are the Shayboveyem, Kondyreva and Oklan from the right, and the Ayanka, Chyornaya and Belaya from the left.

Flora and fauna
Among the fish species in the river the Far Eastern brook lamprey, Pacific lamprey, pike, chir,  Kamchatka grayling, pink salmon, chum salmon, coho salmon, Dolly Varden trout, kundzha, Levanidov char and burbot deserve mention.

See also
List of rivers of Russia

References

Rivers of Kamchatka Krai
Drainage basins of the Sea of Okhotsk